Boris Rhein (born 2 January 1972) is a German lawyer and politician of the Christian Democratic Union (CDU) who has been serving as Minister-President of Hesse since 2022. He has been active in the politics of Hesse since the late 1990s. After being elected to the Landtag of Hesse in 1999, he served as the state's Minister for the Interior from 2010 until 2014 and as the Minister for  Science and Art from 2014 to 2019. On 31 May 2022, he was elected to succeed Volker Bouffier as the Minister-President of Hesse.

Early life and career 
Rhein was born on 2 January 1972 in Frankfurt am Main. His father, Peter Rhein, headed a department at a local school. After obtaining his Abitur at Frankfurt's Lessing-Gymnasium, Rhein studied law at Goethe University Frankfurt from 1991 until 1997. From 2001 until 2006, he practiced as a lawyer in his hometown.

Political career
In 1990, Rhein joined Junge Union, the youth wing of the Christian Democratic Union of Germany (CDU), and served on organisation's state board from 1996 until 2002. 

At the 1999 Hessian state election Rhein was elected to a seat in the Landtag of Hesse, which he occupied until 2006. He then returned to the state parliament at the 2013 Hessian state election. From 2008 to 2012, he led his party in the city of Frankfurt and ran to become its mayor in 2012, but lost to the social democrat Peter Feldmann. Feldmann would be ousted as Mayor by a recall election in the same year he became Minister-President.

Rhein was appointed a Staatssekretär in the Hessian State Ministry of Justice in 2009, but was soon promoted to Staate Minister of the Interior when the CDU-politician Volker Bouffier became the Minister-President of Hesse. His tenure was perceived as conservative by the German media: he endorsed state data retention and a harsher penal code in cases of violence against police officers. In 2014, he was moved to the position of Minister for Science and Art, a position he held until 2019. In the same year, he was elected President of the Hessian Landtag.

Minister-President of Hesse, 2022–present
In 2022, Volker Bouffier, the state's Minister-President and leader of the Hessian CDU, announced that he would vacate his office and designated Rhein as his successor. He was elected to the office of Minister-President on 31 May 2022.

In his capacity as Minister-President, Rhein has been one of Hesse's representatives on the Bundesrat, where he serves on the Committee on Foreign Affairs and the Defence Committee.

Other activities
 Fritz Bauer Institute, Member of the Board (since 2022)
 Hessische Kulturstiftung, Chair of the Board of Trustees (since 2022)
 House of Finance at the Goethe University Frankfurt, Member of the Board of Trustees (since 2022)
 Paul Ehrlich Foundation of the Goethe University Frankfurt, Honorary Chair of the Board of Trustees (since 2022)

Political positions
Even though Rhein was considered a conservative State Minister of the Interior, he rejected this description of his tenure by saying that the office required a rigid enforcement of the law. Citing sources within the party, Süddeutsche Zeitung writes that Rhein had acquired a more centrist profile in the aftermath of his defeat in the 2012 Frankfurt mayoral election.

Personal life
Rhein is married to Tanja Raab-Rhein, a judge and CDU activist. They have two sons, Oskar and Bruno. He is a member of the Catholic Church.

References

Bibliography 

Living people
1972 births
Politicians from Frankfurt
Christian Democratic Union of Germany politicians
Members of the Landtag of Hesse
Goethe University Frankfurt alumni
German Roman Catholics
21st-century German lawyers
Ministers of the Hesse State Government
Knights Grand Cross of the Order of Isabella the Catholic